Cockx is a surname. Notable people with the surname include:
Jan Cockx (1891–1976), Belgian painter perhaps best known for landscapes, still life and harbor scenes
 Marcel Cockx (1930), Belgian painter
 Philibert Cockx (1879–1949), Belgian painter
 Roger Cockx (1914–1991), Belgian painter
 Valerie Cockx, opera singer